Mokket is a rural locality (a Station) in Kolsky District of Murmansk Oblast, Russia. The village is located beyond the Arctic circle at a height of 175 m above sea level.

References

Rural localities in Murmansk Oblast